Weiner is a surname or, in fact, the spelling of two different surnames originating in German and the closely related Yiddish language. In German, the name is pronounced , of which the rare English pronunciation  is a close approximation. In Yiddish, the name is pronounced almost as in southern German (with a flapped or trilled final r).

Outside of German-speaking countries, the pronunciation of the name is influenced by the local language's pronunciation and spelling habits.

The German name Weiner comes from a dialectal pronunciation of Wagner (related to the English word wagon, but only indirectly with wag[g]oner, which means "wagon driver"), which means "wainwright" (wagon maker). The source of the other name that is spelled Weiner is Yiddish, and according to dictionaries of Jewish surnames, it originates from the Yiddish name Vayner, meaning wine merchant, and related to the German word Wein, which means “wine”. Both the Yiddish name and the German word are pronounced with the same vowel as the English word.

The name is common among German Americans. See also German family name etymology.

Weiner may refer to the following persons:

Adam Weiner (born 1975), Polish handball goalkeeper
Allen Weiner, former Stanford Professor of International Law
Andrew Weiner (1949–2019), Canadian science fiction writer
Andrew M. Weiner (born 1958), U.S. electrical engineer
Anthony Weiner (born 1964), former U.S. politician and convicted sex offender
Arnold M. Weiner, U.S. lawyer in Maryland
Art Weiner (1926–2013), U.S. football player
Ben Weiner (born 1980), U.S. contemporary artist
Bernie Weiner (1918–2004), U.S. football player
Bernard Weiner (born 1935), U.S. psychologist
Charles R. Weiner (1922–2005), U.S. federal judge
Dan Weiner (1919–1959), U.S. photojournalist
Dave Weiner (born 1976), U.S. guitarist
David Weiner, a Contributing Editor at the Huffington Post
Edmund Weiner (born 1950), British lexicographer
Egon Weiner (1906–1987), sculptor and professor
Ehud Weiner (changed name to Ehud Manor) (1941–2005), Israeli songwriter, translator, and radio and television personality
Ellis Weiner (born 1951), U.S. author and humorist
Eric Weiner, U.S. author and N.P.R. correspondent
Erik Weiner (born 1977), U.S. actor, comedian, and writer
Ernst Weiner (1913–1945), a German S.S. Hauptsturmführer during World War II
Georg Weiner (1895-1957), German Generalmajor
Gerry Weiner (born 1933), Canadian politician
Greg Weiner, playgirl photographer
Hannah Weiner (1928–1997), U.S. poet
Hans Weiner (born 1950), German former footballer
Herbert Weiner (1919-2013), U.S. Reform rabbi
Irving B. Weiner, U.S. psychologist
Jacob Weiner (born Robert Milton Weiner, born 1947), plant ecologist
Jennifer Weiner (born 1970), U.S. author and former journalist
Jody Weiner, U.S. novelist, nonfiction author, film producer, and lawyer
Jonathan Weiner (born 1953), U.S. popular science author
Joshua Weiner (born 1963), U.S. poet
Juli Weiner, American television writer and blogger
Justus Weiner, international human rights lawyer
Lazar Weiner (1897–1982), a Ukrainian-born, U.S. composer of Yiddish song
László Weiner (1916–1944), Hungarian composer, pianist, and conductor
Lawrence Weiner (1942–2021), U.S. conceptual artist
Lee Weiner (born 1939), U.S. antiwar activist and one of the Chicago Seven
Leo Weiner (1885–1960), Hungarian music educator
Marc Weiner (born 1955), U.S. comedian
Mark Weiner, professor of law
Matthew Weiner (born 1965), U.S. screenwriter, producer and director, creator of Mad Men
Melvin M. Weiner (December 5, 1933 - February 12, 2016) was a mechanical engineer, author, and inventor.
Michael Weiner (actor) (born 1975), U.S. actor and composer
Michael Weiner (professor) (born 1949), Professor at Soka University of America
Michael Savage (born 1942), U.S. talk-show host, born Michael Alan Weiner.
Michael Weiner (executive) (1961–2013), executive director or the Major League Baseball Players Association
Michael Weiner (referee) (born 1969), German football referee
Michele Weiner-Davis, M.S.W., marriage and family therapist and author
Myron Weiner (1931–1999), U.S. political scientist
Randy Weiner (born 1965), U.S. playwright, producer, and theatre/night-club owner
Richard Weiner (Czech writer) (1884–1937), Czech journalist and writer
Richard Weiner (American author) (1927–2014), U.S. film-maker and author
Richard M. Weiner (born 1930), professor of theoretical physics & author
Robert Weiner Jr. (born 1982), U.S. water polo player
Robert S. Weiner, (born 1947), American Democratic strategist and political commentator
Ron Weiner, U.S. television writer
Russell Weiner (born 1970), creator of the Rockstar energy drink
Steve Weiner, Canadian writer and animator
Susan Weiner (1946–2012), politician from Georgia, U.S.
Tim Weiner (born 1956), Pulitzer Prize-winning author
Todd Weiner (born 1975), Atlanta Falcons offensive lineman
William Weiner (born 1955), Armenian - Israeli composer, violinist and vocalist
Zach Weiner (born 1982), author and illustrator, web-comic cartoonist

See also
Wiener (disambiguation)
Robert Weiner (disambiguation)

References 

German-language surnames
Jewish surnames
Occupational surnames
Yiddish-language surnames